Mika'il Sankofa (born Michael Lofton, 10 December 1963 in Montgomery, Alabama) is a world recognized sabre fencer and coach. He competed in the individual and team sabre events at the 1984, 1988 and 1992 Summer Olympics.

Background
During his fencing career, Sankofa trained under Tanya Adamovich, Csaba Elthes, Peter Frohlich, Szabo Adrosh, Christian Bauer and Lazlo Szepesi.

A graduate of New York University with a BA in Economics, Sankofa is a former publicist who has worked for firms such as Ernst & Young, Grey Advertising, Kirshenbaum, Bond & Partners and Shandwick International.

From 1990 - 2009, Sankofa served as co-founder, director of athletics and fencing coach for the Peter Westbrook Foundation. He was responsible for running a year-round class for over 200 participants, including a number of elite-level athletes.  Sankofa's students have included three NCAA champions, five national champions, six junior world team members, the 2005 Junior Olympic men's cadet and junior sabre champions, the 2005 Junior Olympic women's sabre champion and the 2005 national cadet men's sabre champion.

Sankofa also serves as head fencing coach at the United Nations International School as well as the head sabre coach at the Ross School's summer program in East Hampton, New York.  He runs the  Sankofa Sabre Camp  in East Hampton, conducts clinics and does color commentary for fencing competitions around the country.  

In 2006, Sankofa received his Maestro’s degree with honors from Semmelweis University in Budapest, Hungary.

Sankofa served as the head coach for the Stevens Institute of Technology men's fencing team 2005-09.

Sankofa served as an analyst for NBC Sports' coverage of fencing at the 2008 Summer Olympics.

He currently owns and coaches at Thrust Fencing Academy in Nyack, New York. The academy is dedicated to enriching the lives of students age 5 to adult, through the Olympic sport of fencing.

Records 
Sankofa had an outstanding career as a competitive sabre fencer.  He was a member of the United States Olympic Team in 1984, 1988 and 1992, and reached the pinnacle of his sport when he captured US national sabre championships in both 1991 and 1992.

He took part in the Pan-American Games as member of Sabre Team Silver in 1987 and 1991. In addition, Sankofa was a ten-time National Team Sabre Champion, in 1984, 1985, 1986, 1987, 1988, 1990, 1991, 1992, 1994, and 1995.

Sankofa was also a four-time NCAA champion for the Violets, capturing the sabre title in 1984, 1985, 1986 and 1987. He is the only male fencer to ever win four NCAA individual championships.

Hall of Fame 
In 1994, he was inducted into the NYU Sports Hall of Fame, and in the summer of 2005, he was inducted into the United States Fencing Association Hall of Fame.

See also
 USFA
 USFA Hall of Fame
List of USFA Division I National Champions

References

External links 

1963 births
Living people
American male sabre fencers
Sportspeople from Montgomery, Alabama
Olympic fencers of the United States
Fencers at the 1984 Summer Olympics
Fencers at the 1988 Summer Olympics
Fencers at the 1992 Summer Olympics
Pan American Games medalists in fencing
Pan American Games silver medalists for the United States
Pan American Games bronze medalists for the United States
Fencers at the 1987 Pan American Games
Fencers at the 1991 Pan American Games